Statue of Alexander Hamilton (New York City) may refer to:

 Statue of Alexander Hamilton (Central Park)
 Statue of Alexander Hamilton (Columbia University)